Margie Velma Barfield (née Bullard; October 29, 1932 – November 2, 1984) was an American serial killer who was convicted of one murder, but who eventually confessed to six murders in total. Barfield was the first woman in the United States to be executed after the 1976 resumption of capital punishment and the first since 1962. She was also the first woman to be executed by lethal injection.

Life and murders
Velma Barfield was born in rural South Carolina, but was raised near Fayetteville, North Carolina. Barfield's father reportedly was physically abusive and her mother, Lillian Bullard, did not intervene. She escaped by marrying Thomas Burke in 1949. The couple had two children and were reportedly happy until Barfield had a hysterectomy and developed back pain. These events led to a behavioral change in Barfield and an eventual drug addiction.

Burke began to drink and Barfield's complaints turned into bitter arguments. On April 4, 1969, after Burke had passed out, Barfield and the children left the house, and when they returned they found the structure burned and Burke dead. In 1970, Barfield married a widower, Jennings Barfield. Less than a year after their marriage, Jennings died on March 22, 1971, from heart complications.

In 1974, Lillian Bullard, Barfield's mother, showed symptoms of intense diarrhea, vomiting and nausea, only to fully recover a few days later. Later that year during the Christmas season, Bullard fell ill again with the same symptoms, but died in the hospital a few hours after being admitted on December 30, 1974.

In 1975, Barfield was convicted of seven counts of writing bad checks and sentenced to six months in prison. She was released after serving three months.

In 1976, Barfield began caring for the elderly, working for Montgomery and Dollie Edwards in Lumberton, North Carolina. Montgomery fell ill and died on January 29, 1977. Just over a month after the death of her husband, Dollie experienced symptoms identical to those of Bullard and died on March 1. Barfield later confessed to the murder of Dollie Edwards. The following year, Barfield took another caretaker job, this time for 76-year-old Record Lee, who had broken her leg. On June 4, 1977, Lee's husband, John Henry, began experiencing wracking pains in his stomach and chest along with vomiting and diarrhea. He died soon afterward and Barfield later confessed to his murder.

Another victim was Rowland Stuart Taylor, Barfield's boyfriend and a relative of Dollie Edwards. Fearing he had discovered that she had been forging checks on his account, Barfield mixed an arsenic-based rat poison into his beer and tea. Edwards died on February 3, 1978, while she was "trying to nurse him back to health"; an autopsy found arsenic in Taylor's system. After her arrest, the body of Jennings Barfield was exhumed and found to have traces of arsenic, a murder that Barfield denied having committed.  Although she subsequently confessed to the murders of Lillian Bullard, Dollie Edwards, and John Henry Lee, she was tried and convicted only for the murder of Taylor.

Singer-songwriter Jonathan Byrd is the grandson of Jennings Barfield and his first wife. His song "Velma" from his Wildflowers album gives a personal account of the murders and investigation.

Imprisonment and execution
Barfield was imprisoned at Central Prison in Raleigh, North Carolina, in an area for escape-prone prisoners and mentally ill prisoners, as there was no designated area for women under death sentences at the time and she was the state's only female death row inmate. A death row unit for female inmates in North Carolina was subsequently established at the North Carolina Correctional Institution for Women.

During her stay on death row, Barfield became a devout Christian. Her last few years were spent ministering to prisoners, for which she received praise from Billy Graham. Barfield's involvement in Christian ministry was extensive enough that an effort was made to obtain a commutation to life imprisonment.

A second basis for the appeal was the testimony of Dorothy Otnow Lewis, Professor of Psychiatry at New York University School of Medicine and an authority on violent behavior, who claimed that Barfield suffered from dissociative identity disorder. Lewis testified that she had spoken to Barfield's other personality, "Billy", who told her that Velma had been a victim of sexual abuse, and that he, Billy, had killed her abusers. The judge was unconvinced. "One of them did it," Lewis quoted him as saying "I don't care which one."

After Barfield's appeal was denied in federal court, she instructed her attorneys to abandon a further appeal to the U.S. Supreme Court. Barfield was executed on November 2, 1984, at Central Prison. She released a statement before the execution: "I know that everybody has gone through a lot of pain, all the families connected, and I am sorry, and I want to thank everybody who have been supporting me all these six years." Barfield chose as her last meal Cheez Doodles and Coca-Cola. Barfield was buried in a small, rural North Carolina cemetery near her first husband, Thomas Burke.

Barfield's execution raised some political controversies when Governor Jim Hunt, who was challenging incumbent Jesse Helms for his U.S. Senate seat, rejected Barfield's request for clemency.

See also

 Blanche Taylor Moore – a similar murderer who was also from North Carolina

General:
 List of people executed in North Carolina
 List of serial killers in the United States
 List of women executed in the United States since 1976

References

Further reading
 Barfield, Velma. Woman on Death Row. Thomas Nelson Inc. (May 1985). .
 Bledsoe, Jerry. Death Sentence: The True Story of Velma Barfield's Life, Crimes, and Execution. Dutton Adult (October 1, 1998). .

External links
Noe, Denise. All about Velma Barfield. Crime Library. Retrieved on 2007-11-17.

1932 births
1984 deaths
20th-century American criminals
20th-century executions by North Carolina
20th-century executions of American people
Christians from North Carolina
Criminals from North Carolina
Criminals from South Carolina
Executed American female serial killers
Executed people from North Carolina
Executed people from South Carolina
Mariticides
Matricides
People convicted of murder by North Carolina
People executed by North Carolina by lethal injection
People from Fayetteville, North Carolina
Organ transplant donors
Poisoners